This is the complete filmography of actress Andrea King (1919–2003).

Film and television appearances

References

Actress filmographies
American filmographies